De Jonge is a Dutch surname meaning the younger. People with this surname include::

Bonifacius de Jonge (1567-1625), Grand Pensionary of Zeeland
Bonifacius Cornelis de Jonge (1875–1954), Dutch politician
Brendon de Jonge (born 1980), Zimbabwean golfer
Constantin Ranst de Jonge (1635–1714), Dutch whaler
Cornelis Matelief de Jonge (1569–1632), Dutch admiral
Freek de Jonge (born 1944), Dutch cabaret performer
Hugo de Jonge (born 1977), Dutch politician
Jan de Jonge (born 1963), Dutch footballer
Jan Martszen de Jonge (1609–1647) Dutch painter
Johannes Cornelis de Jonge (1793–1853), Dutch politician and historian
 (1828–1880), Dutch historian, museum curator, and draftsman
Laura de Jonge (born 1960), Canadian filmmaker
Maarten de Jonge (born 1985), Dutch racing cyclist
Marc de Jonge (1949-1996), French actor
Mark de Jonge (born 1984), Canadian canoeist
Olivia DeJonge (born 1998), Australian actress
Peter de Jonge (born 1954), American writer
Saskia de Jonge (born 1986), Dutch swimmer

Often "de Jonge" is not part of the surname, but like "junior" indicates that the person's father had the same name. Some examples of these are:
Constantin Ranst de Jonge (1635–1714), Dutch East India Company trader
Cornelis Evertsen de Jonge (1628-1679), Dutch admiral
Jan Jansz de Jonge Stampioen (1610-1690), Dutch mathematician
Ryklof van Goens de jonge (1642-1687), Governor of Dutch Ceylon
Willem van de Velde, de Jonge (1633-1707), Dutch marine painter

See also
De Jong (disambiguation)
De Jongh
Jong (disambiguation)

Dutch-language surnames
Surnames from nicknames